The Caproni Ca.70 was a two-seat night fighter and ground attack biplane produced in Italy in 1925. It was the only Italian aircraft designed from the outset as a night fighter.

Design
The Caproni company designed the Ca.70 to ensure good low-speed handling and good visibility from both cockpits, without any of the aircrafts structural elements obstructing the view of either crewman. Its two wings were of unequal span, and it had tailskid landing gear, an unusual feature of which was an oleo-pneumatic shock absorber on the main landing gear which allowed the wheels to travel forward in their linkage while the plane was taxiing. Armament consisted of two fixed forward-firing 7.7-millimeter Vickers machine guns and a flexible 7.7-millimeter Lewis machine gun on a Scarff ring in the rear cockpit.

Operational history
The Ca.70 first flew in 1925. After the Caproni company finished its tests, it turned the aircraft over to the Regia Aeronautica (Italian Royal Air Force), which tested it at Guidonia Montecelio in 1926, and the Ca.70 performed well, with good handling and performance. However, the Regia Aeronautica had little interest in procuring a two-seat night fighter, and no further examples were built.

Caproni used the design of the Ca.70 for as the basis for a derivative, the Caproni Ca.71 prototype of 1927.

Operators

Regia Aeronautica

Specifications (Ca.70)

See also
Caproni Ca.71

Notes

References

Green, William, and Gordon Swanborough. The Complete Book of Fighters: An Illustrated Encyclopedia of Every Fighter Aircraft Built and Flown. New York: SMITHMARK Publishers, 1994. .
 "The Caproni “Ca 70” Biplane". Flight, 18 February 1926. pp. 95–96.

Ca.070
1920s Italian fighter aircraft
Aircraft first flown in 1925
Sesquiplanes